(literal English translation: "The Realm of Tapio"), Op. 112, is a tone poem by the Finnish composer Jean Sibelius, written in 1926 on a commission from Walter Damrosch for the New York Philharmonic Society. Tapiola portrays Tapio, the animating forest spirit mentioned throughout the Kalevala. It was premiered by Damrosch on 26 December 1926.

History 
Walter Damrosch commissioned the work for the New York Philharmonic Society. Tapiola portrays Tapio, the animating forest spirit mentioned throughout the Kalevala.

When asked by the publisher to clarify the work's program, Sibelius responded with a prose explanation converted by his publisher (Breitkopf & Härtel) into a quatrain prefixed to English language editions of the score:

Wide-spread they stand, the Northland's dusky forests,
Ancient, mysterious, brooding savage dreams;
Within them dwells the Forest's mighty God,
And wood-sprites in the gloom weave magic secrets.

Tapiola was premiered by Walter Damrosch and the New York Symphonic Society on 26 December 1926.

The first performance in Finland on 25 April 1927 was conducted by Robert Kajanus, when the overture to The Tempest and the Seventh Symphony were also introduced to Finland. The composer Leevi Madetoja noted, "At times we hear the melancholy, repeated call of an elf, at times a lonely wanderer in the woods is giving vent to the pain of life. A beautiful work, technically close to the seventh symphony."

The original publisher was Breitkopf & Härtel, who published most of the composer's works. Tapiola was Sibelius's last major work, though he lived for another thirty years. He began working on an Eighth Symphony, but he is said to have burned the sketches after becoming unhappy with the work.

Music 
A typical performance of Tapiola lasts between fifteen and twenty minutes. It is scored for three flutes (third doubling piccolo), two oboes, cor anglais, two clarinets, bass clarinet, two bassoons, contrabassoon, four horns, three trumpets, three trombones, timpani, and strings.

The opening gesture from which the whole piece develops is:

Karl Ekman wrote in the Hufvudstadsbladet: "Indeed, Tapiola is a monothematic whole – although there has been disagreement as to whether the core motif can actually be considered a theme. Erkki Salmenhaara argues that it is not. In his view, the 'core' motif gives rise to at least four central, interconnected basic motifs. These, in their turn, produce 'around thirty highly characteristic, original and inimitably Sibelian musical motifs'."

Selected recordings 
Kajanus, who conducted the Finnish premiere, conducted the first recording with the London Symphony Orchestra for EMI/HMV on 29 June 1932 at Abbey Road Studio 1. In 1953 Herbert von Karajan conducted the Philharmonia Orchestra in the first of his four recordings of the work. (Sibelius regarded Karajan as "the only one who truly understands my work.") Thomas Beecham and the Royal Philharmonic Orchestra recorded the music in 1955; it was one of the first stereophonic recordings made by EMI. Both before and since then, numerous conductors and orchestras have recorded the work.

References

Further reading
Grimley, Daniel M. (Summer 2011). "Music, Landscape, Attunement: Listening to Sibelius's Tapiola," Journal of the American Musicological Society, vol. 64, no. 2, pp. 394–398.  
Mellers, Wilfrid (2001). "Tapiola'''s Search for Oneness and Cunning Little Vixen as a Parable of Redemption." In Singing in the Wilderness: Music and Ecology in the Twentieth Century (Urbana and Chicago: University of Illinois Press), pp. 37–52.

External links

Inkpot review of Tapiola''
 (audio no longer available)
 , Berlin Philharmonic, Herbert von Karajan

Symphonic poems by Jean Sibelius
1926 compositions
Music based on the Kalevala
Music commissioned by the New York Philharmonic